H. K. Narasimhamurthy is a Carnatic violinist.

Life and career
Sri H.K.Narasimha Murthy is a senior and leading violinist hailing from Mysore. He has earned the respect of fellow musicians, critics, students and music-lovers alike, both as an extremely able performer and as a highly accomplished teacher.

Sri Narasimha Murthy's acumen was shaped by his training in the revered Parur school of violin. He had the good fortune of learning under Sri Parur Sundaram Iyer, and later from his illustrious sons M. S. Anantharaman and the legendary Sri M. S. Gopalakrishnan. He also came under the influence of many great musicians of the day, during his education at the Central College of Music, Madras, from where he obtained the degree of Sangeetha Vidwan.

Sri Narasimha Murthy's abilities were recognized early. He won the first prize at the prestigious All India Radio competition, nearly forty years ago. He has since served the organization with great distinction, having been employed as Staff Artiste at AIR, Mysore for several years, earning its ‘A-Top’ grade.

Sri Murthy has, throughout his career, enriched music concerts with his violin accompaniment. His playing technique is marked by great dexterity and unfailing support born out of deep understanding of the main musician. He is a veritable bridge between the past and present generations of musicians and music-lovers, having accompanied a long list of unforgettable stalwarts of yesteryear, including Sri Maharajapuram Viswanatha Iyer, Sri Chembai Vaidyanatha Bhagavathar, Sri Semmangudi Srinivasa Iyer, Smt.D.K.Pattamal, Sri D. K. Jayaraman, and many of the living legends such as Dr.M. Balamuralikrishna, Sri K.J.Yesudas, Sri T.V.Shankaranarayan, Sri T. N. Seshagopalan, Sri K.S.Gopalakrishnan and the Bombay Sisters, Smt.Saroja and Smt. Lalitha. He has also won many fans abroad, beginning with his debut visit to the USA about thirty years ago, accompanying the Bombay Sisters.

Teacher
The lofty credentials of ‘HKN sir’, as he is popularly and respectfully known, continue to serve posterity, by way of preserving the art, especially the Parur style of violin, through his dedicated teaching. He is one of those rare combinations of a very distinguished performer and an exceptional Guru. His exemplary sincerity and humility, and the virtue of giving selflessly and lovingly, mark him out as an Acharya worthy of emulation. He epitomises the traits of a true preceptor. It is an acknowledged fact that mastering the art of playing the violin is a challenge in itself. It is an even bigger challenge to impart that mastery to one's students. The present generation of Carnatic Music is fortunate in that Sri Murthy has trained a large number of very competent violinists, many of whom hold their own at the highest levels of concert performance today. It is indeed a matter of immense gratification that the likes of Sri HKN's son Sri H.N. Bhaskar, Sri Mysore Srikanth and Kum.H.M. Smitha have already established their names in the present competitive world of music. More than fifty of his disciples are professional musicians.

Adding to his impressive contributions to the cause of music is his role in founding the Sri Thyagaraja Sangeetha Sabha, which he has served with great devotion for over two decades and a half, making it one of the most respected organisations in Mysore.

Awards and titles
H.K.Narasimha Murthy has won several awards such as "VISHESHA ACHARYA" award and "The Pappa Venkataramiah Award".

References

External links
Musicacademymadras.in
Thehindu.com
Lokvani.com

Carnatic violinists
Living people
Musicians from Mysore
21st-century violinists
Year of birth missing (living people)